Megastomia canaria is a species of sea snail, a marine gastropod mollusk in the family Pyramidellidae, the pyrams and their allies.

Distribution
This marine species occurs off Queensland, Australia.

References

 Laseron, C. (1959). The family Pyramidellidae (Mollusca) from northern Australia. Australian Journal of Marine and Freshwater Research. 10 : 177-267, figs 1-213

External links
 [http://www.marinespecies.org/aphia.php?p=taxdetails&id=588530 To World Register of Marine Species
 Hedley, C. (1907). The Mollusca of Mast Head Reef, Capricorn Group, Queensland. Proceedings of the Linnean Society of New South Wales. 32: 476-513

Pyramidellidae
Gastropods described in 1907